For Whom the Bell Tolls is a 1940 novel by Ernest Hemingway. Its title originated from John Donne's 1624 work Devotions upon Emergent Occasions.

For Whom the Bell Tolls may also refer to:

Music
 "For Whom the Bell Tolls" (Bee Gees song)
 "For Whom the Bell Tolls" (J. Cole song)
 "For Whom the Bell Tolls" (Metallica song)
 "For Whom the Bell Tolls", a song by Fad Gadget
 "For Whom the Bell Tolls", a song by London from Don't Cry Wolf
 "For Whom the Bell Tolls", a song by Sabaton from Heroes
 "For Whom the Bell Tolls", a song by Saxon from Destiny
 "For Whom the Bell Tolls", a song by W.A.S.P.

Television
 For Whom the Bell Tolls (TV series), a BBC television adaptation of Hemingway's novel
 For Whom the Bell Tolls (Playhouse 90), a 1959 adaptation of the Hemingway novel on Playhouse 90
 "For Whom the Bell Tolls" (Pretty Little Liars), an episode of Pretty Little Liars
 "For Whom the Bell Tolls" (The Vampire Diaries), an episode of The Vampire Diaries
 "For Whom the Bell Tolls", an episode of Andromeda
 "For Whom the Bell Tolls", an episode of Married... with Children
 "For Whom the Bells Toll", an episode of The Wedding Bells

Other uses
 For Whom the Bell Tolls (film), a 1943 film based on Hemingway's novel
 For Whom the Bell Tolls (painting), a 1942 painting by Jean Bellette
 For Whom the Bell Tolls, a volume of the manga One Piece
 Kaeru no Tame ni Kane wa Naru (known in English as The Frog For Whom the Bell Tolls), a 1992 video game for the Game Boy

See also
 "For Whom the Pig Oinks", an episode of  Disenchantment
 Dog Man: For Whom the Ball Rolls, a books in the Dog Man graphic novel series